Joslin is a suburb of Adelaide in the City of Norwood Payneham St Peters. It is rectangular, stretching from Payneham Road (southeast) to the River Torrens and Torrens Linear Park (northwest), but from Lambert Road on the northeast only about 350m along the numbered avenues towards the next cross street which is in St Peters.

The O-Bahn Busway crosses the western corner of the suburb, but there is not a station nearby.

References

Suburbs of Adelaide